Les Corts is one of the ten districts into which Barcelona, Spain has been divided up since 1984, numbered IV. It was created in 1897 out of two former municipalities: Les Corts de Sarrià and some parts of Sarrià (the remaining of which went to become the current district of Sarrià-Sant Gervasi). It had 82,588 inhabitants in the 2005 census, which makes it the least populous district of the city.

It is located in the western part of the city, next to three other districts of Barcelona : Sarrià-Sant Gervasi, Eixample as well as Sants-Montjuïc, and two municipalities of the Metropolitan Area of Barcelona: L'Hospitalet de Llobregat and Esplugues de Llobregat.

Etymology
The name is not derived from courts, but developed from the Latin cohors, cohortes (meaning "rural houses"), as a reference to the local Roman villas and masies which stood there before the 20th-century urbanisation of the area.

Neighbourhoods

It is further divided into the following neighbourhoods:

Les Corts
Pedralbes
La Maternitat i Sant Ramon

See also
Avinguda de Josep Tarradellas, Barcelona

 Street names in Barcelona
 Urban planning of Barcelona

References

External links

Les Corts Official Website

 
Districts of Barcelona